75th Regiment or  75th Infantry Regiment may refer to:

75th Regiment of Foot (disambiguation), several units of the British Army
75th (Middlesex) Searchlight Regiment, Royal Artillery
75th Cavalry Regiment, United States
75th Field Artillery Regiment, United States
75th Infantry Regiment (United States)
75th Infantry Regiment (Ranger), United States (1969–1986)
75th Ranger Regiment (United States)
75th Carnatic Infantry, British Indian Army

Union Army (American Civil War):
75th Illinois Volunteer Infantry Regiment
75th Indiana Infantry Regiment
75th Ohio Infantry
75th Pennsylvania Infantry

See also 
75th Brigade (disambiguation)
75th Division (disambiguation)